In mathematics, a Riesz space, lattice-ordered vector space or vector lattice is a partially ordered vector space where the order structure is a lattice.

Riesz spaces are named after Frigyes Riesz who first defined them in his 1928 paper Sur la décomposition des opérations fonctionelles linéaires.

Riesz spaces have wide-ranging applications. They are important in measure theory, in that important results are special cases of results for Riesz spaces. For example, the Radon–Nikodym theorem follows as a special case of the Freudenthal spectral theorem. Riesz spaces have also seen application in mathematical economics through the work of Greek-American economist and mathematician Charalambos D. Aliprantis.

Definition

Preliminaries 

If  is an ordered vector space (which by definition is a vector space over the reals) and if  is a subset of  then an element  is an upper bound (resp. lower bound) of  if  (resp. ) for all 

Definitions

Preordered vector lattice 

A preordered vector lattice is a preordered vector space  in which every pair of elements has a supremum.

More explicitly, a preordered vector lattice is vector space endowed with a preorder,  such that for any :
 Translation Invariance:  implies 
 Positive Homogeneity: For any scalar   implies 

The preorder, together with items 1 and 2, which make it "compatible with the vector space structure", make  a preordered vector space. 
Item 3 says that the preorder is a join semilattice. 
Because the preorder is compatible with the vector space structure, one can show that any pair also have an infimum, making  also a meet semilattice, hence a lattice.

A preordered vector space  is a preordered vector lattice if and only if it satisfies any of the following equivalent properties: 
For any  their supremum exists in 
For any  their infimum exists in 
For any  their infimum and their supremum exist in 
For any   exists in

Riesz space and vector lattices 

A Riesz space or a vector lattice is a preordered vector lattice whose preorder is a partial order. 
Equivalently, it is an ordered vector space
for which the ordering is a lattice.

Note that many authors required that a vector lattice be a partially ordered vector space (rather than merely a preordered vector space) while others only require that it be a preordered vector space. 
We will henceforth assume that every Riesz space and every vector lattice is an ordered vector space but that a preordered vector lattice is not necessarily partially ordered.

If  is an ordered vector space over  whose positive cone  (the elements ) is generating (that is, such that ), and if for every  either  or  exists, then  is a vector lattice.

Intervals 

An order interval in a partially ordered vector space is a convex set of the form  
In an ordered real vector space, every interval of the form  is balanced. 
From axioms 1 and 2 above it follows that  and  implies  
A subset is said to be order bounded if it is contained in some order interval. 
An order unit of a preordered vector space is any element  such that the set  is absorbing.

If a space is ordered then its order bound dual is a vector subspace of its algebraic dual.

A subset  of a vector lattice  is called order complete if for every non-empty subset  such that  is order bounded in  both  and  exist and are elements of  
We say that a vector lattice  is order complete if  is an order complete subset of

Classification 
Finite-dimensional Riesz spaces are entirely classified by the Archimedean property:
Theorem: Suppose that  is a vector lattice of finite-dimension  If  is Archimedean ordered then it is (a vector lattice) isomorphic to  under its canonical order.

The same result does not hold in infinite dimensions. For an example due to Kaplansky, consider the vector space  of functions on  that are continuous except at finitely many points, where they have a pole of second order.

Basic properties 

Every Riesz space is a partially ordered vector space, but not every partially ordered vector space is a Riesz space.

Note that for any subset  of   whenever either the supremum or infimum exists (in which case they both exist).
If  and  then  
For all  in a Riesz space

Absolute value 

For any  and any real number  we have  and

Disjointness 

Two elements  in a vector lattice  are said to be lattice disjoint or disjoint if  in which case we write  
Two elements  are disjoint if and only if  
If  are disjoint then  and  where for any element   and  
If  is the singleton set  then we will write  in place of  
For any set  we define the disjoint complement to be the set  
Disjoint complements are always bands, but the converse is not true in general. 
If  is a subset of  such that  exists, and if  is a subset lattice in  that is disjoint from  then  is a lattice disjoint from

Representation as a disjoint sum of positive elements 

For all   and  
If  and  then  
Moreover,  if and only if  and 

Every Riesz space is a distributive lattice; that is, it has the following equivalent properties: for all 
  
 
 
 and  always imply 

Every Riesz space has the Riesz decomposition property.

Order convergence 

There are a number of meaningful non-equivalent ways to define convergence of sequences or nets with respect to the order structure of a Riesz space.

A sequence  in a Riesz space  is said to converge in order to  if there exists a monotone converging sequence  in  such that 

Subspaces 

The extra structure provided by these spaces provide for distinct kinds of Riesz subspaces. 
The collection of each kind structure in a Riesz space (for example, the collection of all ideals) forms a distributive lattice.

Sublattices 

Ideals 

Bands and σ-Ideals 

A band  in a Riesz space  is defined to be an ideal with the extra property, that for any element  for which its absolute value  is the supremum of an arbitrary subset of positive elements in  that  is actually in  -Ideals are defined similarly, with the words 'arbitrary subset' replaced with 'countable subset'. Clearly every band is a -ideal, but the converse is not true in general.

The intersection of an arbitrary family of bands is again a band. 
As with ideals, for every non-empty subset  of  there exists a smallest band containing that subset, called  
A band generated by a singleton is called a principal band.

Projection bands 

The collection of all projection bands in a Riesz space forms a Boolean algebra. Some spaces do not have non-trivial projection bands (for example), so this Boolean algebra may be trivial.

Completeness 

A vector lattice is complete if every subset has both a supremum and an infimum.

A vector lattice is Dedekind complete if each set with an upper bound has a supremum and each set with a lower bound has an infimum.

An order complete, regularly ordered vector lattice whose canonical image in its order bidual is order complete is called minimal and is said to be of minimal type.

Subspaces, quotients, and products 

Sublattices

If  is a vector subspace of a preordered vector space  then the canonical ordering on  induced by 's positive cone  is the preorder induced by the pointed convex cone  where this cone is proper if  is proper (that is, if ).

If  with  then the 2-dimensional vector subspace  of  defined by all maps of the form  (where ) is a vector lattice under the induced order but is  a sublattice of  
This despite  being an order complete Archimedean ordered topological vector lattice. 
Furthermore, there exist vector a vector sublattice  of this space  such that  has empty interior in  but no positive linear functional on  can be extended to a positive linear functional on 

Quotient lattices

Let  be a vector subspace of an ordered vector space  having positive cone  let  be the canonical projection, and let  
Then  is a cone in  that induces a canonical preordering on the quotient space  
If  is a proper cone in  then  makes  into an ordered vector space. 
If  is -saturated then  defines the canonical order of  
Note that  provides an example of an ordered vector space where  is not a proper cone.

Product

If  is any set then the space  of all functions from  into  is canonically ordered by the proper cone 

 is a proper cone if all  are proper cones.

Algebraic direct sum

If  are ordered vector subspaces of an ordered vector space  then  is the ordered direct sum of these subspaces if the canonical algebraic isomorphism of  onto  (with the canonical product order) is an order isomorphism.

Spaces of linear maps 

A cone  in a vector space  is said to be generating if  is equal to the whole vector space. 

furthermore,  contains exactly those linear maps that map order intervals of  into order intervals of

Positive functionals and the order dual 

A linear function  on a preordered vector space is called positive if  implies  
The order dual of an ordered vector space  is the set, denoted by  defined by  
Although  there do exist ordered vector spaces for which set equality does  hold.

Vector lattice homomorphism 

Then  is a preordered vector lattice homomorphism if  is linear and if any one of the following equivalent conditions hold: 
 preserves the lattice operations
 for all 
 for all 
 for all 
 for all 
if  then 
 is order preserving.

A pre-ordered vector lattice homomorphism that is bijective is a pre-ordered vector lattice isomorphism.

A pre-ordered vector lattice homomorphism between two Riesz spaces is called a vector lattice homomorphism; 
if it is also bijective, then it is called a vector lattice isomorphism.

If  is a non-zero linear functional on a vector lattice  with positive cone  then the following are equivalent:
 is a surjective vector lattice homomorphism.
 for all 
<li> generates an extreme ray of the cone  in 
An extreme ray of the cone  is a set  where   is non-zero, and if  is such that  then  for some  such that 

Projection properties 

There are numerous projection properties that Riesz spaces may have. A Riesz space is said to have the (principal) projection property if every (principal) band is a projection band.

The so-called main inclusion theorem relates the following additional properties to the (principal) projection property: A Riesz space is…
 Dedekind Complete (DC) if every nonempty set, bounded above, has a supremum;
 Super Dedekind Complete (SDC) if every nonempty set, bounded above, has a countable subset with identical supremum;
 Dedekind -complete if every countable nonempty set, bounded above, has a supremum; and
Then these properties are related as follows.  SDC implies DC; DC implies both Dedekind -completeness and the projection property; Both Dedekind -completeness and the projection property separately imply the principal projection property; and the principal projection property implies the Archimedean property.

None of the reverse implications hold, but Dedekind -completeness and the projection property together imply DC.

Examples 

 The space of continuous real valued functions with compact support on a topological space  with the pointwise partial order defined by  when  for all  is a Riesz space. It is Archimedean, but usually does not have the principal projection property unless  satisfies further conditions (for example, being extremally disconnected).
 Any  space with the (almost everywhere) pointwise partial order is a Dedekind complete Riesz space.
 The space  with the lexicographical order is a non-Archimedean Riesz space.

Properties 

 Riesz spaces are lattice ordered groups
 Every Riesz space is a distributive lattice

See also

Notes

References

Bibliography 

 Bourbaki, Nicolas; Elements of Mathematics: Integration. Chapters 1–6; 
 
 Riesz, Frigyes; Sur la décomposition des opérations fonctionelles linéaires, Atti congress. internaz. mathematici (Bologna, 1928), 3, Zanichelli  (1930)  pp. 143–148

External links

 Riesz space at the Encyclopedia of Mathematics

Functional analysis
Ordered groups